Aronberg is a surname. Notable people with the surname include:

Dave Aronberg (born 1971), American politician
David Aronberg (1893–1967), American businessman and politician